Desa is a commune in Dolj County, Oltenia, Romania with a population of 4,940 people. It is composed of a single village, Desa. 

The commune is the location of the Castra of Desa, a Roman fortification constructed in the 3rd century. A war memorial is dedicated in the center of the village to local losses in the First World War.

References

Communes in Dolj County
Localities in Oltenia
Populated places on the Danube